Branko Tretinjak (16 May 1907 – 27 December 1989) was a Yugoslav fencer. He competed in the team foil event at the 1936 Summer Olympics.

References

External links
 

1907 births
1989 deaths
Yugoslav male foil fencers
Olympic fencers of Yugoslavia
Fencers at the 1936 Summer Olympics